Frank Joseph Zirbel (born 1947) is an American musician, composer, filmmaker and self-taught artist. His work looks at the darker side of being human, satirizing the human condition while celebrating it at the same time. In 1978, he learned how to etch and to this day continues to make prints. In 1979, he became the bass player for the Chicago new wave band, Bohemia. The band went on to tour the United States playing various sized clubs in 1983 and the first half of 1984. He wrote many of Bohemia's more notable songs on their five vinyl releases, including "Automatic Mind," "Empty Room,"  "No Ordinary Moon," and "Love Turns to Stone." The Beatles, The Doors and Chicago blues had a big impact on his writing style. For instance, "Love Turns to Stone," is based on only one chord. After Bohemia broke up in mid 1984, Zirbel waited a year and in 1985 started his own label, Pteranodon Ltd. Editions, and began releasing his own material over the next decades, including "Anatomy of a Pig," (cassette), "Skull Tracks," (CD - EP), "Two-Headed Fly" (CD with two EPs), and "Live at the Big Horse Lounge" (CD - EP). Several Chicago blues and jazz musicians appeared on his "Skull Tracks" CD, including Sunnyland Slim, Carey Bell, Barrett Deems, and Howard Levy.

Since the early 1970s he has produced and directed several short films and rock videos. He often did his own camera work and editing. Gene Siskel took notice of his film, "Duck Eggs and the Miniature Rooster," and interviewed Zirbel live during the first showing of the film on Night Watch in 1977 (name soon changed to Image Union) on Chicago's PBS channel. His film "She-Wolf" was shown at the Chicago Underground Film Festival in 2000 and at the Stuttgart Film Festival in 2001. Zirbel's most recent movie, "Reptilian Calculations," received its world premier at the Paris Short Film Festival in May 2018. It's the fifth episode from the 46 minute compilation, "Seven Gnarled Tales of the Unholy." His drawings on found paper may be one of his most noted series along with the "Asylum" drawings which he did while working at a mental hospital in the mid 1970s.

In 1985, he went on a trip to New York to promote his music and art. The first East Village gallery he approached, Eastman Wahmendorf, placed him in a show and subsequently others. In late November 1986 with the promptings of his gallery, he moved to New York and took up residence at the Times Square Motor Hotel where he resided until moving back to Chicago in mid-1987.

Zirbel has forty years of print making experience. In 2018, he was invited to exhibit multiple states of his etchings at the Jinling Art Museum, in Nanjing, China.

In addition to creating etchings, Zirbel paints, draws and sculpts.

Life
Frank Joseph Zirbel was born in Green Bay, Wisconsin in 1947. In 1970, he graduated from the University of Wisconsin–Madison, with a bachelor of arts degree in Philosophy. His first group show dates back to 1973 at Edgewood Orchard Gallery in Door County, Wisconsin. More than 70 group and several one-man shows have followed. Since 1977, he has made Chicago his home base.

Zirbel moved to New York in November, 1986 (upon encouragement by his East Village N.Y. art dealer, Joseph Sipos – Helio Gallery). In New York, he resided in the Times Square Hotel, 255 W.43rd St. While in New York he struck up a friendship with the N.Y. artist Chaim Koppleman who let him start using his Soho etching studio as a place to work. In mid-summer 1987, Zirbel returned to Chicago.

Work
Zirbel’s art uses representational imagery within the stylistic modes of figurative expressionism and classical surrealism.

He started drawing as a child and is primarily self-taught. His first etchings date to 1978. He started showing art in New York’s East Village in 1985 and for many years thereafter, with twelve N.Y. shows in the late 1980s. Also, Zirbel started oil painting and working in color during this time period, encouraged to do so by his New York dealer who invited him to be in a 1986 exhibition of paintings.

Zirbel has claimed that his initial drawing style came together in the second half of the 1970s while he was working the midnight shift in admissions at the Elgin Mental Health Center, Elgin, Illinois. Here, having previously worked on all the various wards, and with extra time on his hands between admissions, he created unique black-and-white ink drawings inspired by the psychotic and the insane. During his employ at the hospital, Zirbel also made a 16mm documentary film titled "Duck Eggs and the Miniature Rooster" containing an interview with Hermine Pakrovsky, one of the hospital's revolving-door patients. The film made its television debut on Chicago's local PBS affiliate in 1977. Zirbel's dark novel "The Idiot's Grasp" was inspired by his work at the hospital. The novel is now housed in the Museum of Modern Art's artists book collection. In late 1998, Chattanooga, Tennessee art dealer Angela Usrey discovered these works and consigned a few, awarding Zirbel a show at her gallery. In January, 1999, she exhibited these works at New York’s Outsider Art Fair. Usrey named them the "Asylum Drawings." Her Tanner Hill Gallery continued exhibiting this series at the N.Y. Outsider art fair through 2012.
            
Zirbel often has worked in series-related art. One such series, "The Messenger Street Drawing Series" (early 1990s) was inspired by the urban images he saw while working as a bicycle messenger in Chicago. In November 1995, a month after Zirbel quit being a messenger, the Chicago photographer, Mark Debernardi, did a raw video interview with him in his studio reflecting on Zirbel's five year stint on the street. Included in the piece are some works from the messenger drawing series itself. A 1997 exhibition of these drawings at the Judith Racht Gallery, Chicago, garnered Zirbel Chicago Magazine’s selection as Chicago’s best undiscovered artist for that year.

Another set of works revolving around a single theme, Zirbel's "Influencing Artists Series", expanded into etchings, paintings, collage and assemblage and explores the faces and personalities of those who inspired him. In 2005, Susan Aurinko’s Flatfile Galleries, Chicago, presented a surrealist show featuring several paintings from this series, including portraits of Luis Bunuel, Rene Magritte, and an extensive etching series on Edgar Allan Poe.

In  late 2015, The Art Center - Highland Park invited Zirbel to exhibit many of his found object sculptures in a group show. 2016 witnessed a drawing of his being chosen for the Williams College Museum of Art's Walls Collection, in Williamstown, Massachusetts. In 2017, two portraits of Nelson Algren by Zirbel (a painting/collage and a monotype) were purchased by collectors and loaned to the Nelson Algren Museum of Miller Beach, Gary, Ind. for an indefinite time period.

On YouTube, Zirbel's many films and videos can be seen on his film channel, Frank Joseph Zirbel. Recent additions include two films, "The Human Riddle," and "The Mask and the Mirror," from the compilation, "Seven Gnarled Tales of the Unholy," based on drawings he did after Pieter Bruegel's "Seven Deadly Sins" engravings. This set of seven drawings is titled, "Quicksand and Quagmire." The film is an American/German co-production with animation and camera work completed in Munich by Mike Hans Steffl.

In 2018, "Reptilian Calculations," the fifth episode of "Seven Gnarled Tales of the Unholy," premiered on May 9 at the Paris Short Film Festival. The film was also selected for showing during Poland's all summer out door film festival, On Art - Poland, based out of Warsaw, Poland. In August, it received an Honorable Mention at the Los Angeles Experimental Forum Festival and then was chosen for exhibition in late November at the Directors Circle Festival of Shorts, in Erie, Pennsylvania.

Public collections  
Museum of Modern Art - Artists Books Collection / New York, New York
Nelson Algren Museum of Miller Beach / 541 S. Lake St. / Gary, Indiana
Williams College Museum of Art - Walls Collection / Williamstown, Massachusetts
Birmingham Museum of Art / Birmingham, Alabama
Blues Heaven Foundation / 2120 S. Michigan Avenue / Chicago, Illinois
Thorek Memorial Hospital / 850 E. Irving Park Road / Chicago, Illinois
 
In addition to his art work, Zirbel is an accomplished musician on the electric bass guitar. Under the moniker Mental Insect, he has released multiple CDs. In the first half of the 1980s, he was a member of the Chicago new wave band, Bohemia (1979-1984). The band toured the United States in 1983 and 1984. In its lifetime, it released five records, one of them a full album: Deviations, with a Zirbel drawing on the cover.

Press
"Frank Zirbel...a self taught artist admits to a fascination...with subconscious imagery;these pieces are...intriguing, grotesque, yet beautifully rendered." author: Ann Nichols

"Zirbel...is a talented visual artist...Walking Woman...displays Zirbel's remarkable talent for arresting expressive forms."

"...Zirbel has a second passion. Over the last 15 years he's produced a dazzling array of photographs, prints, and more recently, paintings--dense, textured works that reflect a chaotic world beset by violence and greed."

"Much of his visual work explodes with grotesque imagery on found surfaces...He creates from the ruins of civilization...the images portray a strange world but they derive from the found elements."

"Best undiscovered artist...Frank Joseph Zirbel...it's on the visual front that he's poised for a major breakthrough...last summer in a show at Judith Racht's Southport Gallery, his bold paintings and drawings--these last executed on scraps of found paper...created a sensation."

References

1947 births
Living people
People from Green Bay, Wisconsin
University of Wisconsin–Madison College of Letters and Science alumni
Artists from Wisconsin
Musicians from Wisconsin
Date of birth missing (living people)